Khirauna  is a village development committee in Siraha District in the Sagarmatha Zone of south-eastern Nepal. In 1991, it had a population of 2870 living in 496 individual households. Different casts of people live in the village, including Goit, Mandal, Thakur and Paswan. The main occupation of people in the village is agriculture.

References

External links
UN map of the municipalities of  Siraha District

Populated places in Siraha District